The District of Gjakova is one of the seven districts of Kosovo, with seat in the city of Gjakova.

Municipalities 
The district of Gjakova has a total of 4 municipalities and 170 other smaller settlements.

Settlements

Deçan Municipality

 Baballoq/Babaloć
 Beleg
 Dashinovc/Dašinovac
 Deçan
 Ratishi i Ultë/Donji Ratist
 Strellci i Ultë/Donji Streoc 
 Drenovc/Drenovac
 Dubovik
 Gllogjan/Glođane
 Carrabreg I Epërm/Gornji Crnobreg
 Ratishi i Epërm/Gornji Ratis 
 Strellc i Epërm/Gornji Streoc
 Gramaçel/Gramocelj
 Hulaj
 Isniq/Istinić
 Kodrali
 Lpushë/Ljubuša
 Lumbardh
 Maznik
 Papiq
 Prapacan
 Pobërgjë/Pobrđe
 Pozhar
 Prilep/Prelep
 Rastavicë
 Rrzniq I
 Rrzniq II
 Shaptej
 Slup 
 Voksh

Gjakova Municipality 

 Babaj i Bokës
 Bardhasan
 Botushë
 Beci
 Berjahë
 Bishtazhin
 Brekovc
 Brovina
 Qerret
 Qerim
 Cërmjan 
 Damjan
 Deva
 Gjakova 
 Doblibarë
 Dobriqë 
 Novosellë e Poshtme
 Dujakë
 Hereç
 Firza
 Goden
 Novosellë e Epërme
 Gërqina
 Gërgoc
 Gusk
 Jabllanicë
 Jahoc
 Janosh
 Kodralija – Beckë
 Korenica
 Koshare
 Kralane
 Kushavec
 Lipovec
 Marmullë
 Meqë
 Orizë
 Madanaj
 Moglik
 Molliq
 Novokaz
 Osek Hilë
 Osek Pashë
 Palabardhë
 Pjetershtan
 Ponoshec
 Popovc
 Racë
 Rracaj
 Radoniq
 Rakoc
 Ramoc
 Rogova I
 Rogovë II
 Zidi Sadikagës
 Sheremet
 Shishman I Bokes
 Skivjan
 Smaçë
 Smolicë
 Stubell
 Trakaniq
 Ujez
 Vogocë
 Vraniq
 Zhabel
 Zhdrellë
 Zhub
 Zulfaj

Rahovec Municipality 

 Fortesë
 Dejne
 Bratotinë
 Brestovc
 Birnjak
 Celina
 Qifllak
 Damnjan
 Dabidoll
 Pataqan i Ultë
 Drenoc
 Gexhë
 Pataqan i Epërm
 Koznik 
 Kramovik 
 Hoca e Vogël
 Mrasor 
 Nashpalla
 Nagavc
 Apterushë
 Rahovec
 Petkovc
 Polluzha
 Pastasellë
 Radostë
 Ratkovc
 Reti
 Senovc
 Sopniq
 Hoqë e Madhe
 Hoqë e Vogel
 Krusha e Madhe
 Krusha e Vogel
 Vranjak 
 Zatriq 
 Zaçishtë
 Xërxë

Junik Municipality
 Jasiq-Gjocaj
 Junik

Postal Code

Notes

References

External links

Districts of Kosovo